Lisa Love may refer to:

Lisa Love (coach), college volleyball coach, and athletic director
Lisa Love (editor) (born 1955), magazine editor